is a video game in the Goemon series, released for the Family Computer on January 5, 1990 in Japan. In the story, Goemon is searching for his missing pipe. This game introduced many characters that appeared later in the series, such as Yae. It is the first Goemon role-playing game, and the third Goemon game to appear on a Nintendo system.

Sequel
Ganbare Goemon Gaiden 2: Tenka no Zaihō ("Ganbare Goemon Gaiden 2: Treasures of the World") is a sequel released for the Family Computer on January 3, 1992 in Japan. In the story, Goemon is after a treasure.

Like its predecessor, the general goal of the game is to progress from territory to territory by getting to the gate while collecting three passes. There are more pure action stages and fewer randomly hidden passages in this title.

References

External links
 Ganbare Goemon Gaiden: Kieta Ōgon Kiseru at MobyGames
 Ganbare Goemon Gaiden 2: Tenka no Zaihō at MobyGames

1990 video games
1992 video games
Ganbare Goemon games
Japan-exclusive video games
Mobile games
Nintendo Entertainment System games
Video games developed in Japan
Virtual Console games
Virtual Console games for Wii U
Cooperative video games
Japanese role-playing video games